Kasciukoŭka (Belarusian: Касцюкоўка; until 2016 - an urban settlement) - a microdistrict of the city of Gomel, Belarus, in the Čyhunačny administrative district.

Architecture 
The layout is quarterly, the buildings are predominantly brick, multi-storey.

History 
Was founded in the 19th century as a railway station of the Libavo-Romenskaya railway, which began operating in 1873. The settlement grew rapidly, a school was opened, a mill worked in the Pokolyubichsky volost of the Gomel district of the Mogilev province. Since 1879 there was a grain crusher. Every year, more than 400,000 poods of grain and timber cargo were taken out of the station.

In 1918, during the German occupation, the inhabitants stubbornly resisted the German army. Released November 30, 1918. From December 8, 1926 to March 3, 1935, the center of the Kostyukovsky village council of the Gomel region. Since March 3, 1935, within the borders of Gomel, since August 14, 1937, under the administrative subordination of the Gomel City Council. On May 3, 1931, a pig fattening station began to work. On November 10, 1933, the 1st mechanized glass factory in Belarus was put into operation. Since September 27, 1938 - a working settlement. During the Great Patriotic War, the plant's equipment and part of the workers were evacuated to Bashkiria. In August 1941, near the village of the Red Army, along with the Gomel militia on August 18, 1941, they fought heavy defensive battles. 15 Soviet soldiers were killed (buried in a mass grave). From August 18, 1941 to November 26, 1943 it was occupied by German invaders. 79 workers and employees died at the fronts.

From 1986 to 1996 it had the status of an urban settlement.

Since September 1996, the status of a working settlement has been returned.

On February 14, 2016, the settlement was included in the city limits of the city of Gomel and was deregistered as an independent settlement.

Since May 12, 2016, it has been included in the city of Gomel as the Kasciukoŭka microdistrict.

Infrastructure 
In Kasciukoŭka works JSC "Gomelsteklo", EE "Gomel State Agrarian and Industrial College" (previously called the Kostyukovsky State Agrarian and Technical Professional Lyceum), 2 secondary and music schools, a post office, 4 kindergartens, a Palace of Culture, a library, a hospital, a sports complex. The newspaper "Gomel glassmaker" is published here(since May 1, 1934).

See also 

 Urban-type settlements in Belarus

References 

Gomel